The Trixxo Arena is the largest multipurpose arena in Hasselt, Limburg, Belgium used for music concerts, sports (tennis, indoor cycling, jumping, etc.) and other large events. It opened in September 2004 at a total construction cost of €11.7million. The arena complex can hold up to around 21,000 people, with the Main Hall holding a maximum of 18,000.

At the end of 2005, "", an indoor attraction park for children, opened next to the arena and is unique in Belgium.

Until 25 August 2021, the Trixxo Arena was known as the Ethias Arena.

Events
On 26 November 2005, the 3rd Junior Eurovision Song Contest took place in the Ethias Arena.

In 2015, 2016, 2017 and 2020 it hosted the European Championship in darts, a Professional Darts Corporation event.

See also
List of indoor arenas in Belgium

References

External links
 
 Grenslandhallen/Ethias Arena
 World Stadiums

Indoor arenas in Belgium
Buildings and structures in Limburg (Belgium)
Sports venues in Limburg (Belgium)
Sport in Hasselt
Buildings and structures in Hasselt